The discography of Grinspoon, an Australian rock band formed in 1995, consists of seven studio albums, two compilation albums, four extended plays and twenty-four singles.

Albums

Studio albums

Notes

Compilation albums

Video albums

Extended plays

Singles

Non-album/single tracks
"Snap Your Fingers, Snap Your Neck" – ECW: Extreme Music – 27 October 1998 (cover of Prong)
"Same as It Ever Was" – Myspace – 2006
"Not Pretty Enough" – Andrew Denton's Musical Challenge Volume 3: Third Time Lucky! (Kasey Chambers cover), unknown date
"The Drugs Don't Work" – Triple J, Like A Version: Volume One (The Verve cover), 2005
"Saturday Night" – Standing on the Outside (Cold Chisel cover), 2007
"Boys in Town" – No Man's Woman (Divinyls cover), October 2007
"St. Louis" – "Easyfever" Easybeats Tribute Album, October 2008. A video was also recorded and released as a single off the album.
"Champion (2009 version)" – download from official site, 2009
"When You Were Mine" (Prince cover) – performed on Triple J's Like a Version, 2009

Music videos

References

External links
Official Grinspoon Website

Discographies of Australian artists
Heavy metal group discographies